"Ghost Town" is a song by American rock band Cheap Trick, released in 1988 as the third single from their tenth studio album Lap of Luxury. It was written by Diane Warren and guitarist Rick Nielsen, and produced by Richie Zito. The song reached number 33 on the Billboard Hot 100.

"Ghost Town" dated back to 1981 when Nielsen recorded a demo of the song during sessions for the band's One on One album. The song remained undeveloped until the sessions for Lap of Luxury when Warren added some contributions to the finished song.

Music video
The song's music video was directed by Nick Morris and produced by Fiona O'Mahoney. It achieved heavy rotation on MTV.

Critical reception
Upon its release, Billboard commented, "What starts off sounding like vintage ELO develops into a yearning plea highlighted by Zander's vocal." Cash Box listed the single as one of their "feature picks" during November 1988. They stated, "A fine bit of writing by Nielsen and Warren, delivered with gusto by Zander on lead vocals. Cheap Trick is one of the most underrated bands ever." In a review of Lap of Luxury, Spin noted the "great vocal arrangements" and a "George Harrison soundalike guitar solo". Steve Huey of AllMusic described the song as a "grandly romantic power ballad".

Track listing
7-inch single
"Ghost Town" - 4:02
"Wrong Side of Love" - 3:59

7-inch single (US promo)
"Ghost Town" - 4:02
"Ghost Town" - 4:02

12-inch single (US promo)
"Ghost Town" - 4:02
"Don't Be Cruel" - 3:08
"Wrong Side of Love" - 3:59

CD single (US promo)
"Ghost Town" - 4:02

Personnel
Cheap Trick
 Robin Zander - lead vocals, rhythm guitar
 Rick Nielsen - lead guitar, backing vocals
 Tom Petersson - bass, backing vocals
 Bun E. Carlos - drums, percussion

Production
 Richie Zito - producer
 Phil Kaffel - engineer, mixer
 Jim Champagne, Bernard Frings, Mike Tacci, Bob Vogt, Toby Wright - second engineers

Charts

References

1988 songs
1988 singles
Cheap Trick songs
Rock ballads
Song recordings produced by Richie Zito
Songs written by Rick Nielsen
Songs written by Diane Warren
Epic Records singles